Noroeste might refer to:

Geography
Noroeste Rio-Grandense, in Brazil
Colón Centro y Noroeste, in Uruguay
Cerro Noroeste, in the United States
Noroeste, Yucatán, in Mexico
Plaza Noroeste, in Puerto Rico

Sport
Esporte Clube Noroeste, Brazilian football club
Real Noroeste Capixaba Futebol Clube, Brazilian football club
Torneo del Noroeste, Argentine rugby tournament
Liga de Béisbol del Noroeste de México, Mexican baseball league

Other
Aviación del Noroeste, Mexican airline
Astilleros y Talleres del Noroeste, Spanish shipbuilders